Franciska Johanna "Ciska" Jansen (born 23 September 1944) is a retired Dutch track and field athlete. She competed at the 1976 Summer Olympics in the long jump and finished in 18th place.

After she reached age 40, her 6.21m jump exploded the world record for her age group, besting the previous record by Australian Olympian Helen Searle by 52 cm.  For point of comparison, Bob Beamon's record improvement was 55 cm.  Her record would stand for almost 15 years.

References

External links
Meerkamp Vrouwen Periode 1945–1972. atletiekhistorici.nl

1944 births
Living people
Dutch female long jumpers
Dutch pentathletes
Athletes (track and field) at the 1976 Summer Olympics
Olympic athletes of the Netherlands
Athletes from Amsterdam
Dutch masters athletes
World record holders in masters athletics
20th-century Dutch women